Alexandr Anatolyevich Romankov (tr. ; , tr. ) is a former Belarusian fencer from the former Soviet Union, who was born on 7 November 1953 in the town of Korsakov on the island of Sakhalin (just north of Japan). He trained at Dynamo in Minsk and won a gold medal, two silver medals and two bronze medals at the three Olympic Games that he competed in between 1976 and 1988.

Achievements
Olympic Games
 Foil team (1988)
 Foil individual (1976) and Foil team (1980)
 Foil individual (1980, 1988)

Fencing World Cup
  Foil (1974, 1976)
 A ten-time World Champion (1977, 1983 - individual; 1981, 1989 - team; 1974, 1979, 1982 - individual and team).
 A seventeen-time Champion of the USSR.

Honours
 Awarded the title of Chevallier Feyerick by the FIE.
 Has coached the National teams of Australia, Belarus, and Korea.
 Featured in the 2004 Guinness Book of World Records.
 Coached for a few years at FAW, the Fencing Academy of Westchester, in Westchester New York.
 Known sometimes as the "Tsar of Fencing".

See also
Multiple medallist at the World Fencing Championships

References

External links
  (archive)
 

1953 births
Living people
Soviet male fencers
Olympic fencers of the Soviet Union
Fencers at the 1976 Summer Olympics
Fencers at the 1980 Summer Olympics
Fencers at the 1988 Summer Olympics
Dynamo sports society athletes
Olympic gold medalists for the Soviet Union
Olympic silver medalists for the Soviet Union
Olympic bronze medalists for the Soviet Union
Olympic medalists in fencing
Medalists at the 1976 Summer Olympics
Medalists at the 1980 Summer Olympics
Medalists at the 1988 Summer Olympics
Universiade medalists in fencing
Universiade bronze medalists for the Soviet Union
Medalists at the 1979 Summer Universiade